Maria Sophia Pope (1818–1909) was a New Zealand shopkeeper and businesswoman. She was born in London, England in 1818.

References

1818 births
1909 deaths
Businesspeople from London
19th-century New Zealand businesswomen
19th-century New Zealand businesspeople
British emigrants to New Zealand